The following articles contain lists of problems:

List of undecidable problems
Lists of unsolved problems
List of NP-complete problems
List of PSPACE-complete problems